George Seddon may refer to:

 George Seddon (academic) (1927–2007), Australian scientist
 George Seddon (cabinetmaker) (1727–1801), English cabinetmaker

See also
 George Sneddon (born 1949), Scottish international lawn and indoor bowls player